Ed, ed or ED may refer to:

Arts and entertainment 
 Ed (film), a 1996 film starring Matt LeBlanc
 Ed (Fullmetal Alchemist) or Edward Elric, a character in Fullmetal Alchemist media
 Ed (TV series), a TV series that ran from  2000 to 2004

Businesses and organizations
 Ed (supermarket), a French brand of discount stores founded in 1978
 Consolidated Edison, from their NYSE stock symbol
 United States Department of Education, a department of the United States government
 Enforcement Directorate, a law enforcement and economic intelligence agency in India
 European Democrats, a loose association of conservative political parties in Europe
 Airblue (IATA code ED), a private Pakistani airline
 Eagle Dynamics, a Swiss software company

Places
 Ed, Kentucky, an unincorporated community in the United States
 Ed, Sweden, a town in Dals-Ed, Sweden
 Erode Junction railway station, station code ED

Health and medicine
 Eating disorder, mental disorders defined by abnormal eating habits
 Ectodermal dysplasia, a group of syndromes deriving from abnormalities of the ectodermal structures
 Effective dose (pharmacology), the dose of pharmacologic agent which will have a therapeutic effect
 Emergency department, a medical treatment facility specialising in acute care of patients
 Endocrine disruptor, a chemical which can affect the operation of hormonal systems 
 Erectile dysfunction, the inability to develop or maintain an erection of the penis
 Esophageal dysmotility, a digestive disorder

Technology
 NZR ED class, a New Zealand electric locomotive 
 ed (text editor), the standard UNIX text editor
 Electrodialysis, a method of water purification
 Engineering drawing, a type of technical drawing
 Erase Display (ANSI), an ANSI X3.64 escape sequence
 Explosive decompression, a rapid drop in air pressure
 Extra-high density, in reference to a floppy disk

People
 Ed (given name), including fictional characters with the name

Other uses
 Early decision, a form of college admission in the United States
 -ed, an English verb ending
 Ed, an altar built by Israelite tribes by the River Jordan
 Edition (printmaking), a number of prints struck from one plate, usually at the same time
 Edition (book)
 Editor
 Education, as in "tech ed" (technical education) or "phys ed" (physical education)
 Efficiency Decoration, a decoration formerly awarded by militaries of the Commonwealth of Nations
 Encyclopedia Dramatica, a parody-based wiki
 Toyota Carina ED, a C-segment hardtop saloon car
 Dominical letter ED for a leap year starting on Wednesday
 Expiration date (expiry date)

See also

 
 Mr. Ed, a television series about a talking horse of that name
 The Ed Show, a news commentary show that ran from 2009 to 2015
 Edd (disambiguation)
 Eid (disambiguation)
 EDS (disambiguation)